The Port Royal Cays is a small group of uninhabited islands or cays off Port Royal, Jamaica, located at  and arranged in the shape of an atoll with a diameter between 4 and 5 km, and a total area of 12 km². The land area is about 0.03 km². There are eight named cays, including South Cay Rock which is sometimes subsumed with South Cay.

Gun Cay, the northernmost, is only 400 metres from the Jamaican mainland.

The main cay is Lime Cay, on the northeastern rim. It measures 380 metres northwest–southeast, and is up to 80 metres wide, measuring 2 ha in area. About half of the area is wooded, the rest is sand and coral. On the western beach is a wooden hut.

The individual cays, clockwise starting in the north:
Gun Cay (northernmost)
Lime Cay (largest, most important)
Maiden Cay
Southeast Cay (easternmost)
South Cay (almost connected with South Cay Rock)
South Cay Rock (unvegetated, southernmost)
Drunkenmans Cay (westernmost)
Rackhams Cay (smallest)

Literature
T. Goreau and Kevin Burke: "Pleistocene and Holocene Geology of the Island Shelf near Kingston, Jamaica", Marine Geol. 4 (1966), 207-225

External links
Sailing Directions, Caribbean Sea, Vol. I
Gazetteer: Geographic Names of Jamaica

Uninhabited islands of Jamaica
Seabird colonies